José Ramón Ávalos Navarrete was born on 2 January 1935 in the Salvadoran providence of Quezaltepeque to Carmen Navarrete and José Lorenzo Avalos. His mother died after the birth of his younger brother when Jose Ramon was two years old, and he and his brother were adopted by a family friend. In his youth, he attended a local Jesuit school, and later went onto Medical School. While training for his degree, he married his first wife and had a son with him. They divorced within the year. After graduating, he met and married Anna Miriam Sanchez, and had their oldest daughter a year after. Soon after that, Jose Ramon would move to the US to finish his residency and training, have two more girls, and return to El Salvador. In 1977 he had his fourth daughter. At the time, the political unrest was growing, and after the Salvadoran civil war broke out, Dr. Avalos was appointed as a Salvadoran independent politician and doctor who was a member of the Revolutionary Government Junta of El Salvador from 1980 to 1982. After his time there, he would go back to work as a cardiac surgeon until the age of 62. He has lived in El Salvador all of his life, and is loved by his family, friends, and his country.

References 

Salvadoran politicians
People of the Salvadoran Civil War